Jennifer Brown (born June 28, 1980) is a Canadian Paralympic athlete who competes in discus throw and javelin throw at international elite events.

Brown was diagnosed with multiple sclerosis in 2006 after graduating in University of Saskatchewan.

References

External links
 
 

1980 births
Living people
Athletes from Calgary
Paralympic track and field athletes of Canada
Canadian female discus throwers
Canadian female shot putters
Athletes (track and field) at the 2016 Summer Paralympics
People with multiple sclerosis
Medalists at the 2015 Parapan American Games
Medalists at the 2019 Parapan American Games
University of Saskatchewan alumni
20th-century Canadian women
21st-century Canadian women